

Don Antonio Lugo High School is one of the four high schools of the Chino Valley Unified School District located in Chino, California, United States. The mascot is the Conquistador. Don Lugo High School was founded in 1972, and during that year the school only accepted freshmen. Each following year another freshman class was added until the school had all four classes for the first time in 1980.

Notable alumni

 Chad Cordero - professional baseball player 
 Peter Hughes - bassist for the indie-rock band The Mountain Goats
 Todd Jones - frontman of the hardcore punk band Nails
 Joshua Mance -  Olympic sprinter
 Leah O'Brien-Amico - three-time Olympic gold medalist with the US women's softball team
 Moriah Peters -   contemporary Christian singer-songwriter
 Diana Taurasi (b. 1982) - professional basketball player 
 Esera Tuaolo -  football nose tackle
 George Uko -  football defensive end
 Joaquin Zendejas -  football kicker
 Luis Zendejas -  football kicker
 Marty Zendejas -  football kicker
 Max Zendejas -  football kicker
 Tony Zendejas -  football kicker

Footnotes

External links 
 Don Antonio Lugo High School
 Don Lugo Athletics
 Don Lugo High School Marching Conquistadores
 

Educational institutions established in 1972
High schools in San Bernardino County, California
Chino, California
Public high schools in California
1972 establishments in California